The following lists events in 1913 in Iceland.

Incumbents
Prime Minister – Hannes Hafstein

Events
The first Bjargtangar Lighthouse was established.
The newspaper Morgunblaðið was founded.

Births
13 February – Halldóra Briem, architect (d. 1993).
1 March – Ólafur Jóhannesson, politician (d. 1984)
1 September – Guðmundur Arnlaugsson, chess player (d. 1996).

Full date missing
 Björn Sigurðsson, physician (d. 1959)

Deaths

24 January – Eiríkr Magnússon, scholar (b. 1833)

Full date missing
 Steingrímur Thorsteinsson, poet and writer (b. 1831)

References

 
Iceland
Iceland
Years of the 20th century in Iceland